Viva! La Woman is the debut studio album by the band Cibo Matto, released on January 16, 1996, by Warner Bros. Records.

The tracks "Birthday Cake" and "Know Your Chicken" were first released as singles in 1995. Following the release of Viva! La Woman, the latter was reissued as a single in July 1996. Music videos were produced for "Know Your Chicken" and "Sugar Water", directed by Evan Bernard and Michel Gondry, respectively.

Background
Warner Bros. Records signed Cibo Matto after the band's self-titled EP caught the label's attention. The tracks on Viva! La Woman, Cibo Matto's first album for the label, reflected the band's live performances, utilizing pre-recorded samples and loops. Cibo Matto instrumentalist Yuka Honda has expressed regret that she did not stand up for herself when others discouraged her from replacing the samples and loops with new recordings.

Composition
Stereogums James Rettig classifies Viva! La Woman as a trip hop album. Throughout the album, vocalist Miho Hatori's alternately sung, rapped, and whispered performances are backed by Yuka Honda's hip hop-inspired sound collages. New York writer Chris Norris described Hatori and Honda as avant-pop musicians who on Viva! La Woman "weave found sounds, Muzak, and orchestral textures" into "atmospheric" songs. In The New Rolling Stone Album Guide, critic Rob Sheffield described the music as a mixture of hip hop, dub, lounge, and pop.

The album's lyrics balance humorous themes in "Beef Jerky", "Birthday Cake", and "Know Your Chicken" with abstract, often emotional narrative-style wording in "Apple", "Sugar Water", and "Artichoke", as well as overall pop music fare in "White Pepper Ice Cream", "Theme", and "Le Pain Perdu". Several songs feature the group's well-known references to food, primarily present on this release. Honda explained: "Food is something you can't escape. It's there every day." The band would often go to restaurants after rehearsals, and according to Honda, "Cibo Matto grew out of those restaurant times."

"Theme", unusual among Cibo Matto's discography for its length, is a track which features a relatively normal song sung in English with several Italian words before shifting into instrumental passages and leading into a second half that contains entire verses in Japanese and French.

Packaging
The album booklet contains illustrations and lyrics accompanying most of the songs. The only tracks for which the booklet features no lyrics are "The Candy Man", a cover of a song from the 1971 film Willy Wonka & the Chocolate Factory (presumably for copyright reasons; the song also has all lyrical references to Willy Wonka changed to "the candy man"), and "Jive", an 18-second hidden track primarily consisting of a recording of Miho Hatori tapping her thighs, for which she is also credited.

Reception

Viva! La Woman was acclaimed by music critics. Michele Romero of Entertainment Weekly described Cibo Matto as "sonic savants who go nutty mixing disparate ingredients, like avant-garde trumpet with bossa nova bass lines and sugary non-sequitur lyrics", summarizing the album as "kitschy club music, as kooky and lovable as Hello Kitty." Select writer Andrew Male remarked on the album's playful lyrics, while noting that the band is "far more musically adept than yer average guitar 'n' shouting comedy act." The Guardians Caroline Sullivan called Viva! La Woman "an ambitious confection of trickling beats and delicately comatose spoken vocals whose only hint of wackiness is the lyrics", while AllMusic's Heather Phares praised it as "innovative and catchy" and "diverse and entertaining". Spin named Viva! La Woman the tenth best album of 1996 and later ranked it as the 90th best album of the 1990s. The album spent six weeks at number one on CMJ's college radio charts. Some listeners perceived the album as a novelty, "partly because of the cutesy-pie assumptions attached to Asian women in pop and partly because of the band's propensity for writing songs about food", much to Cibo Matto's chagrin.

Writing in The Quietus in 2014, Joe Sweeney regarded Viva! La Woman as "a food-obsessed avant-rap record that dared to be ridiculous at a time when full-throated earnestness... was shipping millions."

Track listing

Sample credits
 "Beef Jerky" contains samples of "Vivre pour vivre", performed by Francis Lai.
 "Sugar Water" contains samples of "Hung Up", performed by Paul Weller; and "Sospesi nel cielo", performed by Ennio Morricone.
 "Theme" contains samples of "Tin Tin Deo", performed by Machito and His Afro-Cuban Jazz Ensemble.
 "Le Pain Perdu" contains samples of "Caravan", performed by Duke Ellington.

Personnel
Credits are adapted from the album's liner notes.
(Where possible, the credits here have been adapted from humorous accreditations in the album's booklet, which are often made to sound sexual or food-related.)

Cibo Matto
 Miho Hatori – vocals ("singing, howling, moaning, sighing"), finger snapping, thigh tapping
 Yuka Honda – keyboards, programming, beach guitar, coughs, finger snapping

Additional musicians

 Dougie Bowne – percussion
 Dave Douglas – trumpet
 Rick Lee – horns
 Jay Rodriguez – saxophone
 Josh Roseman – trombone
 Marc Anthony Thompson – vocal sounds
 Bernie Worrell – organ

Production

 Tchad Blake – production, mixing (also "beneath low end sonics"), recording
 Cibo Matto – production
 Yuka Honda – additional recording on "White Pepper Ice Cream" and "The Candy Man"
 Mitchell Froom – production, assistance ("heavy duty shepherding")
 Jesse Habkell – assistance
 Mike Lee – assistance at Electric Lady Studios
 Bob Ludwig – mastering
 John Paterno – assistance
 Mike Piersante – assistance

Design

 Lance Acord – basement photograph (on CD tray)
 Dave Aron – back cover photograph
 Miho Hatori – booklet illustrations
 Garland Lyn – design assistance
 Mike Mills – art direction, design
 Thomas Thurnauer – cover illustration

Additional personnel

 Tim Carr – A&R ("and street dancing")
 Richard Grabel – "on point"
 Grace Jean – management for Tortured Management
 Simon B. – management for Tortured Management

References

External links
 

1996 debut albums
Cibo Matto albums
Albums produced by Tchad Blake
Albums produced by Mitchell Froom
Albums recorded at Electric Lady Studios
Warner Records albums